6144 Kondojiro is an asteroid discovered on March 14, 1994 by Kin Endate and Kazuro Watanabe at the Kitami Observatory in eastern Hokkaidō, Japan. It is named after Jiro Kondo, a Japanese Egyptologist and professor of archaeology at Waseda University.

Orbit and classification 

The orbit of 6144 Kondojiro is unusual for a number of reasons, including:
 An eccentricity greater than 0.3,
 A semi-major axis between that of an outer main-belt asteroid (3.2 AU < a < 4.6 AU) and a Jupiter trojan (4.6 AU < a < 5.5 AU),
 A relatively low inclination  for a Jupiter-crossing minor planet, and
 A lack of proper orbital elements due to recurring perturbations by Jupiter.
It is difficult to classify an object with such a peculiar orbit using a conventional definition. Despite this, the Minor Planet Center (MPC) lists it as a main-belt asteroid, even though both the orbital and physical properties of 6144 Kondojiro suggest that it may be an extinct comet rather than a true asteroid. The JPL Small-Body Database lists only 33 such objects that have an observation arc greater than 30 days.

See also
 List of minor planets
 944 Hidalgo 
 3552 Don Quixote

References

External links 
 
 

006144
006144
Discoveries by Kin Endate
Discoveries by Kazuro Watanabe
Named minor planets
006144
006144
19940314